Jenifer McKitrick (born May 5, 1966 in Defiance, Ohio) is a songwriter.  She was a founding member of bands including The Bettys, Swingin' Doors,
Spank the Eggman, The Outskirts, Orange Sunshine, and Some Girls.
Currently living in Ohio, She finished work on a new electronic/soundtrack album, Digitosis, released on August 30, 2022 and an album including new s songs and unreleased archival tracks, Road Call, released on December 1, 2022, and is planning a re-issue of Glow on vinyl and CD in 2023. She is currently producing self-directed music videos and "Killer" has been chosen as an Official Selection in the Five Continents International Film Festival in Venezuela “Killer”, along with “I’m Ready (More Your A$$) are official selections in the Marilyn Monroe Film Festival in Los Angeles.

Discography 
 Saved My Soul with the Bettys (1983 cassette), (streaming remaster 2021)
 unhinged with Swingin' Doors (1995)
 Glow (2001) Producers: Sandy Pearlman and Jenifer McKitrick  
 Digitosis (Electronic, Instrumental, and Soundtrack) (2021)
 Garage à Trois with The Outskirts (2021)
 Follow the Magic (2021)
 Swingin' Doors Live at the Bottom of the Hill(2021)
 Swingin' (Live Covers(2021)

Personnel

The Bettys 
Jenifer McKitrick
Carolyn Getson
Cecelia Soluri
Lynn Okiki
Diane Glaub

The Outskirts 
Jenifer McKitrick
Mia Walsh
Denese Hathaway
Lisa Brown
JoAnne Avalon

The Swingin' Doors 
Jenifer McKitrick
Dwight Been
Stephanie Lee
Diane Glaub
Todd Duda
Terry Dowling contributed lap steel and slide guitar on the unhinged album.

Glow
Jenifer McKitrick: Vocals, guitars, harmonica 
Chuck Prophet: Guitars
Katharine Cole: Acoustic guitar, vocals 
Tony Marsico: bass 
Dawn Richardson: Drums and percussion 
Stephanie Lee: Violin 
Chris Von Sneidern: Piano, organ 
Recorded by Noah Rabinowitz and Eric Westfall at Alpha and Omega, San Rafael, CA. 
Additional recording, production and mixing by Chris von Sneidern at Ordophon Studio, San Francisco, CA. 
Mastered by Ken Lee at Kenneth Lee Mastering. 
Tape editing by Paul Stubblebine 
Tape transfer by Laura Hanna.
Produced by Sandy Pearlman and Jenifer McKitrick

Guest Appearances 
Johnny in Monsterland (2021) Jenifer composed the song "Shake the Fear" for the film.
Gang Vocals, "Run Primo Run" on Chuck Prophet album No Other Love

References

External Links 
Jenifer McKitrick discography on Discogs
Artist website
Official artist YouTube Channel
Jenifer on IMDb

1962 births
Living people
Songwriters from Ohio
People from Defiance, Ohio